Center Line Public Schools is a school district headquartered in Center Line, Michigan, United States in Metro Detroit, serving most of Center Line and adjacent parts of Warren. The School district dates to 1899.

Current Schools

Secondary schools
 [[Center Line
 High School]] (Center Line)
 Center Line Jr High 
School (Center Line)
 Center Line college School (Center Line)

Primary schools (Pre-K through Grade 5)

 Center line  Elementary School (Center Line)

 Center line preschool 

(Center Line)

Former Schools
 CLOSED—Miller Elementary School (Center Line) -- closed June 2010.  Leased to Rising Stars Academy starting in 2012.
 RE-PURPOSED—Ellis School (now houses Special Services and Academy 21)
 RE-PURPOSED—Busch School (now houses Food Services and Technology)

References

External links

Macomb Intermediate School District

Education in Macomb County, Michigan
School districts in Michigan
Warren, Michigan
School districts established in 1899